Pachydactylus boehmei is a species of thick-toed gecko belonging to the Pachydactylus weberi group, found in Namibia.

Etymology
The specific name, boehmei, is in honor of German herpetologist Wolfgang Böhme.

References

Endemic fauna of Namibia
Geckos of Africa
Reptiles described in 2010
Reptiles of Namibia